Westerford High School is a public English medium co-educational high school situated in the suburbs of Rondebosch and Newlands in Cape Town in the Western Cape province of South Africa.

It has a campus in Rondebosch where the main school buildings are located and a secondary campus in Newlands used for sport. The school is located close to the Newlands Rugby Ground and Table Mountain.  The school opened on 21 January 1953 and celebrated its Diamond Jubilee on 7 March 2013.

Westerford enjoys a prominent position in the local community, hosting visits from key figures within South Africa such as the then President of South Africa, Nelson Mandela and guest speakers such as former Minister of Education Kader Asmal .

In 2009, Westerford High School was ranked by the Sunday Times newspaper as the top state school in South Africa and one of the largest feeder schools for the University of Cape Town.

History

Westerford opened at the beginning of January 1954, housed in an old homestead which no longer exists.  The site was originally known as Westervoort (Afrikaans for "continue West"), but the school was known as Claremont Secondary School from the name of the school which shared a property with a small primary school on Dean Street.  The pupils from Claremont Secondary school had transferred their desks to the new property at the end of 1952

Noel Taylor, the first headmaster, began referring to the institution as Westerford Secondary School and in 1953 the Cape School Board recognised the name.  In 1956 when the first pupils matriculated the school became Westerford College Schools.

The institution enjoyed rapid growth from 29 pupils to 34 in its first year and grew further until 1959 when a new hall, named for the first headmaster, was opened as part of new school buildings for the 504 pupils and 27 staff members employed.

Origin of School Badge
The first headmaster, Mr Noel Taylor, is credited with the design of the school badge.  It is said that when he paid a visit to the site, he saw the sun setting behind Devil's Peak, the light shining through the oak trees on the property.  Based on this scene he sketched the design, which is still in use today. However, the badge is also very similar to nearby Oakhurst Primary School (established 47 years earlier) and the two schools share the same motto.

Campus
The institution is currently based on the same site as the original homestead, although no trace of the homestead remains.  The school now has extensive facilities for use by the students, including a dedicated sports centre and AstroTurf.

Students
The school has approximately 900 pupils in 5 grades ranging from ages 14 to 18.  There are roughly equal numbers of girls and boys in classes kept ideally below 30 learners.

A Westerford Matric pupil was placed 12th in the Senior Certificate Examination results for 2005. The school also received a book voucher award in the Senior Certificate Awards for 2005 for achieving excellent academic results. The school was placed in the top 10 schools in the Western Cape with a 100% pass rate, 47% distinction and 96% matriculation endorsement rate. In July 2006 a Westerfordian won the national English Olympiad.

In the final results in 2006 the school was again in the top 10 with a 100% pass rate, 46% distinction and 98% endorsement rate. In 2007 again the pass rate was 100%, the distinction rate 43% and endorsement rate 97%.

Faculty
The current school headmaster is Mr Mark Smith, and the school has 100 teaching, administration, maintenance and grounds staff.

Former School Headmasters
Mr Noel Taylor 1953-1976
Dr John Gibbon 1977-1995
Mr Alan Clarke 1995-2005
Mr Rob le Roux 2005-2019

Extracurricular activities
The institution currently has over 40 clubs and societies run by pupils.  These are involved in many facets of the school's life from art and culture through to religion, politics and social welfare. One of the most prolific of these clubs is History and Current Affairs, a student-run society which holds events where speakers come and address students and teachers. Examples of speakers who History and Current Affairs have hosted include Jacob Zuma, Kader Asmal, Justice Albie Sachs among many more.

Curriculum
Westerford  is a state school that offers quality education and has an art and a music department.  Students have ten specific learning areas in grades 8 and 9 and eighth  subjects for grades 10, 11 and 12 with an elective ten subjects.

Notable alumni 

 Thuthukile Zuma, Chief of Staff for the Department of Telecommunications and Postal Services.
 Brendan Young, cricketer.
 John Bauer, South African potter.
 Farhaan Behardien, cricketer.
 Sir Bradley Fried, businessman
 Alan Committie, comic actor.

References

External links
 School website

Schools in Cape Town
Educational institutions established in 1953
1953 establishments in South Africa
High schools in South Africa
Rondebosch